Šluŋkkajávri or Sluņkajávrre is a lake in the municipality of Hamarøy in Nordland county, Norway. The large lake Rekvatnet lies just to the west of this lake. The ending -jávri or -jávrre is the Sami language word for lake.

See also
List of lakes in Norway

References

Hamarøy
Lakes of Nordland